Suburra: Blood on Rome is an Italian crime drama television series set in Rome. It is based on the 2015 film Suburra, in turn inspired by the novel of the same name by Giancarlo De Cataldo and Carlo Bonini. The series was developed by Daniele Cesarano and Barbara Petronio for Netflix, making it the first Italian-language original television series produced by the company. It is produced by Cattleya in association with Rai Fiction and Bartleby Film.

Suburra draws from the real life events of the Mafia Capitale investigation and focuses on power clashes and corruption among organized crime, politicians and churchmen. The series revolves around Aureliano Adami (Alessandro Borghi), an Ostia-based gang member, and his relations with Alberto "Spadino" Anacleti (Giacomo Ferrara), a Sinti gang member, and Gabriele "Lele" Marchilli (Eduardo Valdarnini), the only son of a policeman who becomes involved in crime. Samurai (Francesco Acquaroli), an antagonist to the Adamis, is the head of Roman organized crime and contact for the Sicilian Mafia in Rome; he approaches politician Amedeo Cinaglia (Filippo Nigro) to aid in his Ostia affairs. Sara Monaschi (Claudia Gerini) is a Vatican financial auditor for lands in Ostia.

Series overview

Episodes

Season 1 (2017)

Season 2 (2019)

Season 3 (2020)

References

Lists of Italian television series episodes
Lists of crime drama television series episodes